The 2011 Ukrainian Amateur Cup was the sixteenth annual season of Ukraine's football knockout competition for amateur football teams. The competition started on 16 August 2011 and concluded on 12 November 2011.

Competition schedule

First qualification round

Second qualification round

Quarterfinals (1/4)

Semifinals (1/2)

Final

See also
 2011 Ukrainian Football Amateur League
 2011–12 Ukrainian Cup

External links
 2011 Ukrainian Amateur Cup at the Footpass (Football Federation of Ukraine)

Ukrainian Amateur Cup
Ukrainian Amateur Cup
Amateur Cup